The Second Yoshida Cabinet is the 48th Cabinet of Japan. It was headed by Shigeru Yoshida from October 15, 1948 to February 16, 1949.

Cabinet

References 

Cabinet of Japan
1948 establishments in Japan
Cabinets established in 1948
Cabinets disestablished in 1949
1949 disestablishments in Japan